Bernard Pesquet (March 18, 1922 – May 10, 2009), known as The Landru of Val-d'Oise, was a French serial killer who killed at least six people between 1941 and 1976. Spending a total of 53 years behind bars, he was sentenced to life imprisonment for the latter murders, dying in prison in 2009.

Early life 
Bernard Pesquet was born on March 18, 1922, in Heugleville-sur-Scie. When his mother died, he was brought up by his maternal grandfather until 1931, after being relentlessly rejected by the latter's partner.

In 1936, at the age of 14, Bernard Pesquet was sent to boarding school for a period of four months. His first job was in a glass factory, but gave up after a year.

In 1938, at the age of 16, Bernard Pesquet joined his uncle in Rouen to become a cook, but quit his job a month later.

On September 29, 1939, he was arrested on charges of shoplifting, but was later acquitted.

On March 18, 1940, his 18th birthday, Bernard Pesquet passed his radio electrician exam. He obtained his emancipation then moved into a two-room apartment, 95, rue aux Ours, which he made both his home and his workshop. In the district, Pesquet is nicknamed "the little electrician".

In June 1940, Pesquet was required to work at the German Soldier's Foyer. Every morning, a black front-wheel drive comes to pick it up in order to carry out several repairs in the various depots and buildings in the city. Bernard Pesquet did his job with the awareness and skill that everyone knows. Pesquet, tossed about by events that go beyond him, seemed not to ask himself any questions, so others described him as "mysterious". From time to time, Mr. John Anderson comes to see him at his home, under various pretexts.

In 1941, at the age 19, Bernard Pesquet met a certain Julien Quibel, a young man in his twenties, who quickly became his lover. Pesquet later explained that he had discovered that Quibel was a collaborator on the side of the Germans.

First murder 
On August 22, 1941, in Rouen at around 11 p.m., Bernard Pesquet beat Julien Quibel to death with an iron bar and slashed his veins with a razor. Having no possibility of defending himself against his lover, Quibel died of his wounds. The body was found the next day, not far from Pesquet's home. Bernard Pesquet was, at the time of the facts, 19 years old and was quickly suspected by those close to Quibel because of their romantic relationship.

Arrested on August 25, 1941, Pesquet played against the police. It was not until the third day of his custody that he confessed to having killed Quibel. Pesquet specified that he killed Quibel to steal his savings and his money, because of his collaboration with Germany. He was imprisoned for the assassination of his friend. He was then 19 years old. Bernard Pesquet, being over sixteen at the time of the facts, faced the death penalty, even if it has little chance of being applied, because Pesquet was still a minor at that time (the majority being fixed at 21 years old).

On November 8, 1941, Bernard Pesquet was sentenced to hard labor for life. As a minor, he escaped the death penalty. At that time, life imprisonment did not allow the possibility of release. Bernard Pesquet expected to die, during his life sentence of hard labor.

Detention 
On March 18, 1943, Bernard Pesquet reached his majority. At the start of Pesquet's incarceration, France was at war and many prisoners were starving to death in detention. However, Bernard Pesquet managed to survive these daily famines, due to his young age. Having retracted his crime in the meantime, Pesquet also requested a review of his trial on December 28, 1944.

On May 8, 1945, as World War II ended after a long-term journey, prison conditions improved for Pesquet, then 23 years old. The young inmate subsequently received the result of his request from the court of revision which, considering Bernard Pesquet's retractions as a means of release, rejected Pesquet's request in July 1945.

In 1951, the reductions in sentence were introduced. Pesquet had already served ten years in prison, when he is only 29 years old.

On June 4, 1960, penal labor was abolished in France, and Pesquet's sentence was automatically converted to a life sentence with a chance of parole in August 1956. Pesquet was considered a likely candidate for release, as he was a model inmate with a clean record according to the Prison Administration.

Released and respite 
On Octobre 12, 1961, Pesquet was paroled, after serving a 20-year sentence, returning to mainland France. Aged 39, he said he was "happy" to finally be able to build a life. He also becomes a self employed painter

In the mid-1960s, he met Christiane Ruaux, who was 19 years his junior, whom he married in December 1968.

From the early 1970s, Christiane Pesquet began to run away when disputes broke out with Bernard Pesquet. She is described as a "fickle woman".

In December 1972, the Pesquet couple began a move to Pierrelaye and settled there at the beginning of 1973.

In 1974, after only 5-years and half of marriage, Christiane Pesquet discovered her husband's criminal past as well as his homosexuality. Bernard Pesquet was bisexual and learned that his wife wishes to leave him, then became suspicious of her.  She did not rejoice in Bernard's past.

The Landru of Val-d'Oise

Serial murders 
On November 23, 1974, Bernard Pesquet ambushed his wife Christiane, 33, and killed her with a 7.65 mm rifle. Following this, he left her in agony until her death and then buried her corpse under a meter of earth in his second basement, at his home in Pierrelaye. In the days following the murder of his wife, Bernard Pesquet, questioned by the neighborhood, pretended his wife had run away again, following an umpteenth argument between the couple.

On January 28, 1975, Bernard Pesquet wrote a letter to the parents of his wife, that their daughter had turned out to be a "fickle wife", "interested" and "spendthrift". Pesquet also wrote in his letter that he was sorry for the "departure" of his wife. Although the claim she had run away was credible, Christiane was nevertheless wanted for a simple loan not repaid to her family. Following this, the disappearance of Christiane Pesquet results in classification without continuation; for lack of dependent elements.

On April 30, 1976, Henri Franqui, a 52-year-old real estate agent, went to Bernard Pesquet in Pierrelaye, in order to buy his house after several unsuccessful attempts in the past. Annoyed, Pesquet shoots Franqui with his 7.65 mm rifle, then buried the body of his victim in the basement, as he had done with his wife. Bernard Pesquet, then financially ruined, subsequently used Franqui's checkbook to do some shopping and also sold the latter's car.

On July 29, 1976, at around 11:30 a.m., Bernard Pesquet went to Neuilly-sur-Seine to visit a retired couple, Emile Bergaud, 71, his wife Alice Bergaud, 73, as well as their servant Alfeia Borgioni, aged 63. Under the pretext of repainting the house of the retired couple, Pesquet, being again in debt, killed the Bergaud couple as well as Mrs. Borgioni, using his 7.65 mm rifle, before stealing the booty and valuables and goods. He left without anyone stopping him.  Upon the discovery of the three bloodied corpses, Commissioner Claude Cancès was immediately appraised of this homicide case. When they arrived at the scene, the police discovered that Ms. Bergaud had received a letter from Bernard Pesquet, in which the latter had announced that he was coming to the couple's home.

On July 30, 1976, knowing that Bernard Pesquet lived in the region, the gendarmes went to his home for his testimony. But, upon the police learning that Pesquet has already spent 20 years of his life in prison for murder, they decided to immediately place him in custody.  Bernard Pesquet having been free for fifteen years, he is the ideal culprit. Jewels and gold bars belonging to the Bergaud couple were found at Pesquet's home, but the 54-year-old man remained silent on the triple murder of Neuilly-sur-Seine.

Detention and end of death penalty 
On August 1, 1976, Bernard Pesquet was imprisoned for the triple murder of the Bergaud couple and their servant. Although he denied it, Pesquet faces the death penalty. However, the gendarmes, including Claude Cancès, suspected him of being at the origin of several suspicious and unresolved disappearances, including the disappearance of his wife which occurred less than two years earlier.

On August 11, 1976, the investigators renewed their search and found the skeletal body of Christiane Pesquet, as well as that of Henri Franqui in advanced decomposition. Cornered, Bernard Pesquet confessed to the two assassinations and is charged with them. Pesquet immediately earned the nickname of Landru du Val-d'Oise, because of his modus operandi resembling that of Landru; a modus operandi that had served him to kill his wife and his real estate agent. Happy to have indicted the repeat offender, Commissioner Claude Cancès and the other investigators were still convinced that Bernard Pesquet may have killed other people between his release from prison in October 1961 and his arrest in July 1976.

On August 14, 1976, Bernard Pesquet tried to escape but, aged 54, Pesquet was immediately overpowered by prison guards who intervened. Prosecuted for the murders of five people, Bernard Pesquet immediately knew he was faced with the death penalty, which had become a sort of "lottery" for criminals.

In January 1977, during the trial of Patrick Henry, Robert Badinter delivered his last plea for the abolition of the death penalty. He underlines the responsibility of the Advocate General, claim the head of the young man, while he will not attend his future execution. Badinter also shows that almost all other European countries have abolished the death penalty, as well as the incompatibility between judicial killing and Christian morality. Patrick Henry was sentenced to life imprisonment, after Robert Badinter went directly to the members of the jury, stating :

"If you vote as Mr. Advocate General asks you to, I tell you, time will pass, the uproar and encouragement will be over, you will be left alone with your decision. The death penalty will be abolished, and you will be left alone with your verdict, forever. And your children will know that you once sentenced a young man to death. And you will see their gaze! ".

Following the conviction of Patrick Henry, having caused a "scandal of justice", two condemned to death will be still guillotined in France: Jérôme Carrein on June 23, 1977, and Hamida Djandoubi on September 10, 1977. The other condemned to death would be later pardoned by President Valéry Giscard d'Estaing or see their sentence commuted with their cassation appeal.

Between 1977 and 1979, Bernard Pesquet and his lawyers tried, as best they could, to plead any mental pathology, in order to obtain the penal irresponsibility of Pesquet and avoid the death penalty. The defense of the accused was based on the fact that Bernard Pesquet began to paint various pictures with, according to them, different "disconnections from reality", thus being able to suggest that Pesquet had schizophrenia. However, the psychiatric experts contested the defense request, showing that Bernard Pesquet was seeking to delay his judgment, in order to avoid the guillotine. Following Pesquet's manipulations, the psychiatric experts thus proved that he was aware that his crimes and, that he did not have any mental pathology, therefore held him responsible for his acts.

In 1980, aged 58, Bernard Pesquet was referred to the Assize Court of Val-d'Oise.

The death penalty was finally abolished on October 9, 1981, by Robert Badinter, who became Keeper of the Seals. Since the trials of Bernard Pesquet had not yet taken place at that time, Pesquet now faced life imprisonment.

Trial 
On June 18, 1982, Bernard Pesquet was tried for the assassinations of Christiane Pesquet (November 23, 1974), that of Henri Franqui (April 30, 1976), as well as the triple assassination of Neuilly-sur-Seine (July 29, 1976). He was then 60 years old. The trial lasted nearly six years, which was the longest trial at this time. Tried before the Court of Assizes of Val-d'Oise, Pesquet pleaded the "crime of passion" vis-à-vis the murder of his wife, then confessed to having killed Henri Franqui because the latter annoyed him with the purchase request if his house. However, Bernard Pesquet denied the triple homicide of Neuilly-sur-Seine. The death penalty having been abolished, Pesquet was sentenced on June 25, 1982, to life imprisonment.

Following his conviction, Bernard Pesquet lodged an appeal in cassation, which quashed the verdict under technicality on July 12, 1983.

On April 17, 1984, Bernard Pesquet was sentenced for his five assassinations but, affected by a prostate tumor, did not appear before the Court of Assizes in Paris. Hospitalized, Pesquet still denied a triple murder in Neuilly-sur-Seine. Although he was not present during the hearing, Bernard Pesquet, 62, was again sentenced to life imprisonment.

Death 
After spending 33 years behind bars, Bernard Pesquet died on May 10, 2009, at Fresnes Prison at 87.

See also 
 List of French serial killers

References

External links

Radio broadcast 
 "Bernard Pesquet, the Landru of the Val-d'Oise" (March 30, 2017) on L'Heure du crime, presented by Jacques Pradel. (in French)

1922 births
2009 deaths
20th-century French criminals
French male criminals
French people convicted of murder
French prisoners sentenced to life imprisonment
French serial killers
Male serial killers
People convicted of murder by France
People from Seine-Maritime
Prisoners sentenced to life imprisonment by France
Serial killers who died in prison custody
Uxoricides